The Weissmies  is a mountain in the Pennine Alps in the canton of Valais in Switzerland near the village of Saas-Fee. It is the easternmost four-thousander of its range.

Geography 

The Weissmies is located on the main Alpine chain, on a massif separating the Saastal valley on the west and Simplon valley on the east. The massif consists of two other main summits lying to the north at almost the same altitude, the Lagginhorn and Fletschhorn. The mountain lies between the Lagginjoch (3,500 m) to the north and the Zwischbergen Pass (3,260 m) to the south.

The Weissmies is one of the 10 four-thousanders surrounding the Saastal, facing the Dom on the west, the third highest summit of the Alps.

Climbing 

It was first climbed by Jakob Christian Häusser and Peter Josef Zurbriggen in 1855 via the Triftgrat. The ascent was mired in some controversy as the local guides did not believe that the peak could be ascended without their help; when they themselves ascended to the summit by following Häusser and Zurbriggen's footprints, they found that the highest point had indeed been reached.

The east face was climbed first by J. A. Peebles, Mr E. P. Jackson and Margaret Jackson with guides P. Schlegel, U. Rubi and J. Martin on 17 October 1876. The more difficult south face was climbed in 1884 by C. H. Wilson, A. Burgener, J. Furrer. Two weeks later, W. H. and E. Paine with T. Andenmatten and P. Zurbriggen opened a route on the northern ridge.

The approach to the Trift Glacier/south-west ridge (Triftgrat) route can now be made via lift to Hohsaas (3,100 m), which is located virtually at the edge of the glacier. The ascent from Hohsaas takes about 4 hours and involves slopes to 40 degrees and crevasses. Another route starts from the Zwischbergen Pass (above Almageller Hut) at the foot of the southern ridge.

See also

List of 4000 metre peaks of the Alps

References

Bibliography 
 Dumler, Helmut and Willi P. Burkhardt, The High Mountains of the Alps, London: Diadem, 1994

External links

 The Weissmies on Distantpeak.com
 The Weissmies on SummitPost
 description of route to Weissmies from the Almageller Hut

Alpine four-thousanders
Mountains of the Alps
Mountains of Valais
Pennine Alps
Mountains of Switzerland
Four-thousanders of Switzerland